Sabahat Ali Bukhari is a Pakistani actress. She is known for her roles in dramas Baby, Naik Parveen, Hari Hari Churiyaan, Sanam, Qismat Ka Likha and Aakhir Kab Tak.

Early life
Sabahat was born in 1968 on 25th October in Lahore, Pakistan. She completed her studies from Government Girls College Lahore.

Career
Sabahat started as an news announcer in 1989 on PTV. In 1995 she made her debut as an actress on PTV dramas. She was noted for her roles in dramas Koi Nahi Apna, Surkh Jorra, Kaisi Khushi Le Ke Aya Chand, Shanakht, Ghar Aik Jannat and Shikwa. Sabahat also used to host morning show Subah Bakhair Vibe Ke Saath on Vibe TV. Then she appeared in dramas Sanam, Naik Parveen, Hari Hari Churiyaan, Baby and Be Aitbaar. Since then she appeared in dramas Beti Jaisi, Mein Jeena Chahti Hoon, Qismat Ka Likha and Aakhir Kab Tak.

Personal life
Sabahat is married and has one son.

Filmography

Television

Telefilm

Film

Awards and nominations

References

External links
  
 

1968 births
Living people
20th-century Pakistani actresses
Pakistani television actresses
21st-century Pakistani actresses
Pakistani film actresses